Three-time defending champion Björn Borg successfully defended his title, defeating Roscoe Tanner in the final, 6–7(4–7), 6–1, 3–6, 6–3, 6–4 to win the gentlemen's singles tennis title at the 1979 Wimbledon Championships.

Seeds

  Björn Borg (champion)
  John McEnroe (fourth round)
  Jimmy Connors (semifinals)
  Vitas Gerulaitis (first round)
  Roscoe Tanner (final)
  Guillermo Vilas (second round)
  Arthur Ashe (first round)
  Víctor Pecci (third round)
  Brian Gottfried (third round)
  Wojciech Fibak (first round)
  John Alexander (third round)
  José Higueras (second round)
  Manuel Orantes (second round)
  José Luis Clerc (fourth round)
  Tim Gullikson (quarterfinals)
  Corrado Barazzutti (first round)

Qualifying

Draw

Finals

Top half

Section 1

Section 2

Section 3

Section 4

Bottom half

Section 5

Section 6

Section 7

Section 8

References

External links

 1979 Wimbledon Championships – Men's draws and results at the International Tennis Federation

Men's Singles
Wimbledon Championship by year – Men's singles